Masujirō, Masujiro, Masujirou or Masujiroh (written: ,  or ) is a masculine Japanese given name. Notable people with the name include:

, Japanese footballer and manager
, Japanese politician
, Japanese military leader
, Imperial Japanese Navy admiral

Japanese masculine given names